Kellan Christopher Lutz (born March 15, 1985) is an American actor and model. He made his film debut in Stick It (2006), and is best known for playing Emmett Cullen in The Twilight Saga film series (2008–2012). He has since played Poseidon in the 2011 film Immortals, voiced the title character in the 2013 animated film Tarzan, played John Smilee in The Expendables 3 (2014), and Hercules in The Legend of Hercules (2014). He co-starred in the CBS thriller series FBI: Most Wanted (2020–2021).

Early life
Kellan Christopher Lutz was born on March 15, 1985, in Dickinson, North Dakota, the son of Karla (née Theesfeld; b. 1960) and Bradley Lutz (b. 1960), both of German descent. He has six brothers, Brandon, Tanner, David, Daniel, Brad, and Chris. Lutz grew up in the Midwest and in Arizona, and graduated from Horizon High School in Scottsdale, Arizona. Before deciding to pursue an acting career, he attended Chapman University to pursue a degree in chemical engineering.

Career

Lutz had recurring roles on Model Citizens (2004) and The Comeback (2005), and smaller roles in episodes of The Bold and the Beautiful, CSI: NY, Summerland, Six Feet Under, CSI: Crime Scene Investigation, and Heroes. He was also in the films Stick It (2006), Accepted (2006), and Prom Night (2008). Additionally, Lutz has performed on the California stage and was the host of Bravo's Blow Out. He also appeared in the 2006 commercial for Hilary Duff's fragrance With Love... Hilary Duff, and in the 2007 music video for her single, "With Love". In 2008, he appeared in another music video, Hinder's "Without You". In the same year, Lutz also appeared in the miniseries Generation Kill, based on the book by Evan Wright, and had a starring role in the film Deep Winter.

Lutz's big break came when he played Emmett Cullen in the film adaptations of the Twilight (2008) saga by Stephenie Meyer. He reprised his role for all four follow-up films, beginning with The Twilight Saga: New Moon (2009). He also appeared as George Evans in the 90210 spinoff (2009) on The CW. Lutz also appeared the 2010 remake A Nightmare on Elm Street as Dean, "a well-liked, well-off high school jock", in April 2010. He reprised his role as Emmett Cullen in the third installment of the Twilight saga, The Twilight Saga: Eclipse (2010), and then appeared as the feisty Poseidon, God of the Sea in Immortals (2011). Lutz reunited with his Twilight co-star and close friend, Ashley Greene, in the film A Warrior's Heart (2011). He was considered for the lead role in Conan the Barbarian (2011), but eventually lost out to Jason Momoa. He also reunited with his Immortals co-star Mickey Rourke in the action film Java Heat (2013), which was shot in Indonesia. In 2012, Lutz was one of the candidates for the male lead in the film Hansel and Gretel: Witch Hunters, a role that ultimately went to Jeremy Renner. Lutz starred in the epic The Legend of Hercules (2014), but the film was a critical and commercial failure, and Lutz was nominated for two Golden Raspberry Awards.

Lutz is signed with Ford Models. He is one of the models featured in the 2010 Calvin Klein X underwear campaign.

In 2012, Lutz made a special guest appearance on the TV show 30 Rock, playing a version of himself who is related to the character J.D. Lutz, played by actor John Lutz. In 2011 and 2012, he again portrayed Emmett Cullen, in the fourth and fifth Twilight installments, The Twilight Saga: Breaking Dawn – Part 1 and Part 2 (2012).

In 2016, Lutz starred in the thriller film Money with Jamie Bamber, Jesse Williams, and Jess Weixler directed by Martin Rosete and produced by Atit Shah. Lutz had also appeared as the main lead in Science Fiction Volume One: The Osiris Child and Guardians of the Tomb.

On June 24, 2016, Lutz tweeted that he had a meeting with McG and Mary Viola about playing the role of He-Man.

Beginning in 2020, Lutz played FBI Special Agent Kenny Crosby on CBS's FBI: Most Wanted. He left the role in the third-season premiere to move his family back to California.

Philanthropy
Lutz's primary charity is "Saving Innocence" which works to rescue and rehabilitate child victims of sex trafficking in the United States. He was GQs Gentleman of the Year for his work with this organization, and has been the organization's public ambassador since 2011. Lutz dedicates his birthday each year to financially benefit Saving Innocence, and runs campaigns for them on a regular basis.

In 2010, Lutz was a spokesman for PETA's "Adopt, Don't Buy" campaign. He is also a supporter of West African primate conservation charity Ape Action Africa, and used the Dublin premiere of the film Tarzan to raise funds for the charity's work to save endangered gorillas and chimpanzees. Lutz endorsed the documentary film The Paw Project, which focuses on the declawing of exotic and domesticated cats in America.

He is also a supporter of rebuilding efforts in New Orleans, in particular with the St. Bernard Project.

In 2013, he co-founded Foresight Creative Group, a product development company specifically focuses on his patents and inventions. The company, which is partnered in with various charities which he promotes on his social media outlets, released a sleep mask and a dice game named after Lutz.

Personal life
Lutz enjoys numerous outdoors and fitness activities, and prefers to perform his own stunts when making films. Although Lutz enjoys watching crime movies, he prefers to star in action films. He is a Christian.

In October 2017, Lutz revealed that he was engaged to TV host and model Brittany Gonzales. On November 23, 2017, Lutz and Gonzales announced that they had married. On November 28, 2019, Lutz announced on his Instagram account that he and Gonzales were expecting a baby girl in 2020. On February 6, 2020, Gonzales announced the unexpected loss of their baby six months into the pregnancy. The couple's daughter was born in February 2021, and a son was born in August 2022.

Filmography

Film

Television

Music videos

Awards and nominations

References

External links

 
 

1985 births
Living people
21st-century American male actors
American Christians
American male film actors
American male television actors
American Muay Thai practitioners
American people of Dutch descent
American people of German descent
American practitioners of Brazilian jiu-jitsu
Chapman University alumni
Male actors from North Dakota
Male models from North Dakota
People from Dickinson, North Dakota